Thomas de Berkeley may refer to:

Thomas de Berkeley, 4th feudal Baron Berkeley ( 1170–1243)
Thomas de Berkeley, 1st Baron Berkeley (1245–1321), grandson of the above
Thomas de Berkeley, 3rd Baron Berkeley (c. 1293 or 1296–1361), grandson of the above
Thomas de Berkeley, 5th Baron Berkeley (1352/53–1417), grandson of the above
Thomas de Berkeley (MP) for Gloucestershire

See also
Thomas Berkeley (disambiguation)